Villeneuve-Saint-Vistre-et-Villevotte is a commune in the Marne department in north-eastern France.

Gallery

See also
Communes of the Marne department

References

Villeneuvesaintvistreetvillevotte